Rodolfo Jesús Hernández (born April 9, 1968) is a Venezuelan Major League Baseball coach and a former minor league infielder, coach and manager.  On November 12, 2014, he was named assistant hitting coach of the Minnesota Twins and  represented his third season in the post.  He was born in Maracay, Aragua, Venezuela.

A former second baseman and third baseman, Hernández played for five seasons (1987–91) in the New York Mets' farm system, peaking at the Double-A level. He batted .250 in 493 games played.

Hernández was named to manager Paul Molitor's 2015 coaching staff after serving for 14 seasons as a coach and instructor in the Twins' minor-league system, including managerial assignments with the Rookie-level Elizabethton Twins (2001) and Gulf Coast League Twins (2002–03).  He previously worked as a Venezuela-based scout for the Twins.

At the time of his appointment, Hernández was also serving as bench coach with the Aragua Tigers of the Venezuelan Winter League.

References

External links

1968 births
Living people
Baseball infielders
Jackson Mets players
Kingsport Mets players
Major League Baseball hitting coaches
Minor league baseball coaches
Minor league baseball managers
Minnesota Twins coaches
Minnesota Twins scouts
People from Turmero
St. Lucie Mets players
Venezuelan baseball coaches
Venezuelan expatriate baseball players in the United States
Williamsport Bills players